Logan Square may refer to:

 Logan Square, Chicago, a neighborhood on the north side of the city
 Logan Circle (Philadelphia) or Logan Square, a park in Philadelphia
Logan Square, Philadelphia, the surrounding neighborhood